was a Japanese football player. He played for the Japanese national team.

Club career
After graduating from high school, Azumi played for Osaka SC was founded by his alma mater high school graduates and many Japan national team players Kiyoo Kanda, Fukusaburo Harada, Usaburo Hidaka, Toshio Hirabayashi, Setsu Sawagata, Kikuzo Kisaka, Yoshio Fujiwara, Shumpei Inoue, Yoshimatsu Oyama, Toshio Miyaji, Uichiro Hatta, Sakae Takahashi and Kiyonosuke Marutani were playing in those days.

National team career
In May 1923, Azumi was selected Japan national team for 1923 Far Eastern Championship Games in Osaka. At this competition, on May 23, he debuted against Philippines. This match is Japan team first match in International A Match. He also played at 1925 Far Eastern Championship Games in Manila. He played 3 games for Japan until 1925. But Japan lost in both matches.

National team statistics

References

External links
 
 Japan National Football Team Database

Year of birth missing
Year of death missing
Place of birth missing
Place of death missing
Japanese footballers
Japan international footballers
Association football forwards